Joan Arlene Spillane (born January 31, 1943) is an American former competition swimmer, Olympic champion, and former world record-holder.

Spillane competed at the 1960 Summer Olympics in Rome, where she received a gold medal as a member of the winning U.S. team in the women's 4×100-meter freestyle relay, together with teammates Molly Botkin, Shirley Stobs and Chris von Saltza.  She, Botkin, Stobs and Saltza set a new world record in the 4×100-meter freestyle of 4:08.9.  Spillane also swam the freestyle leg for the gold medal-winning U.S. team in the preliminary heats of the women's 4×100-meter medley relay, but she was ineligible for a medal under the 1960 international swimming rules because she did not swim in the event final.

Spillane attended the University of Michigan.

See also
 List of Olympic medalists in swimming (women)
 List of University of Michigan alumni
 World record progression 4 × 100 metres freestyle relay

References

See also
 

1943 births
Living people
American female freestyle swimmers
World record setters in swimming
Olympic gold medalists for the United States in swimming
People from Glen Ridge, New Jersey
Swimmers at the 1959 Pan American Games
Swimmers at the 1960 Summer Olympics
University of Michigan alumni
Medalists at the 1960 Summer Olympics
Pan American Games gold medalists for the United States
Pan American Games medalists in swimming
Medalists at the 1959 Pan American Games
21st-century American women